The Time Weekly is a weekly newspaper which covers current affairs. It is based in Guangzhou, China, and belongs to the Guangdong Publish Group()

The Time Weekly was established in 2008 and is a partner with The New York Times. It is published on Thursday every week and has five parts: politics, review, economy, culture and world.

References

External links
Official Website of The Time Weekly
English news about The Time Weekly

Weekly newspapers published in China
Chinese-language newspapers (Simplified Chinese)
Mass media in Guangzhou